This is a list of the National Register of Historic Places listings in Olympic National Park.

This is intended to be a complete list of the properties and districts on the National Register of Historic Places in Olympic National Park, Washington, United States.  The locations of National Register properties and districts for which the latitude and longitude coordinates are included below, may be seen in a Google map.

There are 33 properties and districts listed on the National Register in the park.

Current listings

|}

See also 
 National Register of Historic Places listings in Clallam County, Washington
 National Register of Historic Places listings in Grays Harbor County, Washington
 National Register of Historic Places listings in Jefferson County, Washington
 National Register of Historic Places listings in Washington

References 
Evans, Gail E.H.; Toothman, Stephanie; Luxenberg, Gretchen; Wray, Jacilee. National Register of Historic Places Multiple Property Documentation Form:Historic Resources of Olympic National Park. National Park Service 1986, 1998, 2005

External links

National Register of Historic Places in Washington (state)